Nemanja Pribak (born 26 March 1984) is a Serbian-born Macedonian handball player for Hapoel Rishon LeZion.

Career
After playing for his hometown club Železničar Niš, Pribak moved abroad to Slovenian side Trimo Trebnje in 2006. He also spent two years with Macedonian club Vardar, before returning to Serbia. In the 2009–10 season, Pribak played for Kolubara and helped the club win the Serbian Handball Super League and Serbian Handball Cup for the first time ever.

At international level, Pribak represented Serbia in the 2011 World Men's Handball Championship. He later switched allegiance to Macedonia, making his major debut at the 2014 European Men's Handball Championship.

Honours
Kolubara Serbian Cup 2009-2010
 Serbian Handball Super League: 2009–10.
 Vojvodina 2020-2021, 2021-2022
Serbian Supercup 2019-2020
 Serbian Handball Cup: 2019-2020 , 2020-2021
Vardar
 Macedonian Handball Super League:2008-2009 2012–13, 2014–15 
 Macedonian Handball Cup: 2007-2008 , 2013–14, 2014–15 , 
 SEHA League: 2013–14
Beşiktaş
 Turkish Handball Super League: 2015–16, 2016–17, 2017–18, 2018–19
 Turkish Handball Cup: 2015–16, 2016–17, 2017–18, 2018–19
Turkish Supercup 2015-2016, 2017-2018, 2018-2019, 2019-2020

References

External links
 EHF record
 LNH record

1984 births
Living people
Sportspeople from Niš
Macedonian people of Serbian descent
Serbian male handball players
Macedonian male handball players
RK Vardar players
RK Kolubara players
RK Vojvodina players
Expatriate handball players
Serbian expatriate sportspeople in Slovenia
Serbian expatriate sportspeople in North Macedonia
Serbian expatriate sportspeople in France
Serbian expatriate sportspeople in Turkey
Macedonian expatriate sportspeople in Turkey